Michael Porter (born 25 March 1964) is an Australian former professional rugby league footballer who played for the Cronulla Sharks.

Porter is the son of premiership winning St. George second rower Monty Porter, who was Cronulla's inaugural captain in 1967.

A local junior from the Engadine Dragons, Porter debuted for Cronulla in 1984 and started out as a prop. He made 154 first-grade appearances for Cronulla, often featuring as a hooker, which included finals series in both 1988 and 1989.

In 1988/89 he spent a season in England with the Hull Kingston Rovers.

References

External links
Michael Porter at Rugby League project

1964 births
Living people
Australian rugby league players
Cronulla-Sutherland Sharks players
Hull Kingston Rovers players
Rugby league players from Sydney
Rugby league props